San Manuel Stadium is an open-air ballpark in downtown San Bernardino, California, United States. It opened in 1996, replacing Fiscalini Field as the home park of Minor League Baseball's Inland Empire 66ers of San Bernardino. Before then, the 66ers shared Fiscalini Field with CSUSB Coyotes and SBVC Wolverines. San Manuel Stadium is named after the San Manuel Band of Mission Indians, which is based in San Bernardino and paid for the naming rights. The stadium seats 8,000 people, with additional capacity provided by lawn seating.

It is located directly next to the San Bernardino Transit Center, with connections to Los Angeles Union Station.

History
San Manuel Stadium was also the home field for the California State University, San Bernardino Coyotes baseball team. The Coyotes play in the California Collegiate Athletic Association in Division II of the National Collegiate Athletic Association NCAA. In 2004, it also served as the home of the Los Angeles Unity, the city's Pro Cricket team. In 2010, San Manuel Stadium was equipped with a new scoreboard, which was the largest in the California League. In 2010, CSUSB moved its home games to Fiscalini Field, San Bernardino's former minor league stadium. The San Manuel facilities are used by the San Bernardino Valley College's baseball team as well.

References

External links
 San Manuel Stadium official website

College baseball venues in the United States
Cal State San Bernardino Coyotes sports venues
Minor league baseball venues
Cricket grounds in the United States
Baseball venues in California
Sports venues in San Bernardino, California
1996 establishments in California
Sports venues completed in 1996
Populous (company) buildings
California League ballparks